Ophiocomidae are a family of brittle stars of the suborder Ophiurina.

Systematics and phylogeny
Ophiocomidae has been placed (along with Ophionereididae) to the superfamily Ophiocomidea and infraorder Gnathophiurina or suborder Gnathophiurina in different classifications.

Genera
The following genera are included in the family according to the World Register of Marine Species (WoRMS):

 Subfamily Ophiocominae 
Genus Clarkcoma Devaney, 1970
Genus Ophiarthrum Peters, 1851
Genus Ophiocoma L. Agassiz, 1835
Genus Ophiocomella A.H. Clark, 1939
Genus Ophiocomina Koehler, 1920 in Mortensen
Genus Ophiomastix Müller & Troschel, 1842
Genus Ophiopteris E.A. Smith, 1877
 Subfamily Ophiopsilinae
Genus Ophiopsila Forbes, 1843

References

External links

 
Ophiacanthida
Echinoderm families